Bourg-en-Bresse is the prefecture of the Ain department in the Auvergne-Rhône-Alpes region in Eastern France. In 2018, the commune had a population of 41,248.

Geography
Bourg-en-Bresse is located at the western base of the Jura Mountains, on the left bank of the Reyssouze, a tributary of the Saône.

History
Roman remains have been discovered at Bourg, but little is known of its early history. It was probably pillaged by Goths in Late Antiquity. Raised to the rank of a free town in 1250, it was at the beginning of the 15th century the capital of the dukes of Savoy in the province of Bresse. In February 1535 it was conquered by France during a full-scale invasion of Savoy, but was restored to Duke Philibert Emmanuel in 1559, when he married Henri II's sister Marguerite. The duke later built a strong citadel, which afterwards withstood a six-months' siege by the soldiers of Henry IV during the Franco-Savoyard War of 1600–1601. The town was finally ceded to France in 1601. In 1814, the inhabitants, in spite of the defenseless condition of their town, offered resistance to the Austrians, who put the place to pillage.

Demographics

Politics 

Since 2008, Jean-François Debat of the Socialist Party (PS) has been Mayor of Bourg-en-Bresse. He was reelected following the 2020 municipal election.

In the four last presidential elections, Bourg-en-Bresse voted as following:

Sights 

Bourg-en-Bresse Cathedral, also known as the church of Notre-Dame (Cathédrale Notre-Dame-de-l'Annonciation de Bourg-en-Bresse), which dates back to the 16th century, has a façade built in the Renaissance; other parts of the church are Gothic. In the interior there are stalls of the 16th century.

The other public buildings, including a handsome prefecture, are modern. The town hall contains a library and the Lorin Museum with a collection of pictures, while another museum has a collection of old costumes and ornaments characteristic of Bresse. Among the statues in the town there is one of historian Edgar Quinet, a native of Bourg-en-Bresse.

The Royal Monastery of Brou, named after the suburb settlement of Bourg-en-Bresse in which it lies, is of great artistic interest. Margaret of Bourbon, wife of Philip II of Savoy, had intended to found a monastery on the spot, but died before her intention could be carried into effect. The church was actually built early in the 16th century by her daughter-in-law Margaret of Austria, wife of Philibert le Beau of Savoy, in memory of her husband.

The exterior, especially the façade, is richly ornamented, but the chief interest lies in the works of art in the interior, which date from 1532. The most important are the three mausoleums with the marble effigies of Marguerite of Bourbon, Philibert le Beau and Margaret of Austria. All three are remarkable for perfection of sculpture and richness of ornamentation. The rood loft, the oak stalls and the reredos in the chapel of the Virgin are masterpieces in a similar style. The monastery has three cloisters from the early 16th century. The church and the cloisters are listed monuments.

Economy 
In the early 20th century, the city manufactured iron goods, mineral waters, tallow, soap and earthenware. There were flour mills and breweries; there is considerable trade in grain, cattle and poultry.

Transport 
Bourg-en-Bresse station offers rail connections to Paris, Strasbourg, Lyon and Geneva by high-speed rail, as well as several regional destinations with TER Auvergne-Rhône-Alpes services. The A39 motorway connects Bourg with Dole and Dijon, the A40 with Mâcon and Geneva.

Sport 
Football Bourg-en-Bresse Péronnas 01 is based in the town.

On 3 May 1953 a motorcycle racing meeting was held on a circuit going past the Residence Emile Pélicand and the Jardin d'Enfants Emile Pélicand.

Miscellaneous 
Bourg is the prefecture of the department and the location of a court of assizes; it has a tribunal of first instance, a tribunal and a chamber of commerce, as well as a local branch of the Bank of France.

Bourg-en-Bresse was the finish of Stage 6 and the departure of Stage 7 in the 2007 Tour de France.

Personalities 
Bourg-en-Bresse is the birthplace of:

 Claude Gaspard Bachet de Méziriac (1581–1638), mathematician
 Julien Benneteau, (born 1981), tennis player
 Georges Blanc (born 1943), chef
 Raymond Chevallier (1929–2004), historian and archaeologist
 François Clerc (born 1983), footballer for Olympique Lyonnais and France
 Alain Giletti, (born 1939), ice skater
 Jérôme Lalande (1732–1807), astronomer, freemason and writer.
 Isabelle Lonvis-Rome (born 1963), magistrate and minister
 Daniel Morelon (born 1944), cyclist
 Jean-Bernard Gauthier de Murnan (1748–1796), French officer for the Continental Army and general during the French Revolution
 Lionel Nallet, (born 1976), international rugby union player
 Jacques Pépin (born 1935), chef
 Edgar Quinet (1803–1875), historian and man of letters.
 Jérôme Tafani (born 1958), businessman

Twin towns – sister cities 

Bourg-en-Bresse is twinned with:

  Bad Kreuznach, Germany
  Aylesbury, England
  San Severo, Italy
  Parma, Italy
  Namur, Belgium
  Brzeg, Poland
  El Kef, Tunisia

See also 
 Arpitania
 Bressan
 Bresse chicken
 Communes of the Ain department
 Pierre-Marie Poisson

References

External links 

 City council website (in French)

Communes of Ain
Prefectures in France
Bresse
1250 establishments in Europe
1250s establishments in France
Populated places established in the 13th century
Ain communes articles needing translation from French Wikipedia